The men's light heavyweight event was part of the boxing programme at the 1956 Summer Olympics.  The weight class was allowed boxers of up to 81 kilograms to compete. The competition was held from 23 November to 1 December 1956. 11 boxers from 11 nations competed.

Medalists

Results

First round
 Andrzej Wojciechowski (POL) def. Lennart Risberg (SWE), RSC-3
 Gheorghe Negrea (ROU) def. Piet van Vuuren (SAF), PTS
 Ottavio Panunzi (ITA) def. Gerald Collins (CAN), PTS

Quarterfinals
 Romualdas Murauskas (URS) def. Anthony Madigan (AUS), PTS
 James Boyd (USA) def. Rodolfo Díaz (ARG), PTS
 Carlos Lucas (CHI) def. Andrzej Wojciechowski (POL), PTS
 Gheorghe Negrea (ROU) def. Ottavio Panunzi (ITA), PTS

Semifinals
 James Boyd (USA) def. Romualdas Murauskas (URS), PTS
 Gheorghe Negrea (ROU) def. Carlos Lucas (CHI), PTS

Final
 James Boyd (USA) def. Gheorghe Negrea (ROU), PTS

References

 https://web.archive.org/web/20080912181829/http://www.la84foundation.org/6oic/OfficialReports/1956/OR1956.pdf

Light Heavyweight